Große Zirmbergschanze is a ski jumping large hill in Ruhpolding, Germany.

History
It was built from 1962 to 1962 and owned by Ski-Club Ruhpolding. It hosted one FIS Ski jumping World Cup event in 1992. Ronny Ackermann holds the hill record.

World Cup

Men

Ski jumping venues in Germany
Buildings and structures in Traunstein (district)
Sports venues completed in 1962
1962 establishments in West Germany
Sports venues in Bavaria
Sport in the Alps